Rockford Township is a township in Carroll County, in the U.S. state of Missouri.

Rockford Township was named for a rocky ford on the Grand River.

References

Townships in Missouri
Townships in Carroll County, Missouri